East Liberty is an unincorporated community in Delaware County, in the U.S. state of Ohio.

History
East Liberty was laid out in 1840, but the town site's inland location away from railroads hampered its growth.

References

Unincorporated communities in Delaware County, Ohio
Unincorporated communities in Ohio